

Plants
A fossilized rainforest is discovered in a coal mine.

Angiosperms

Fungi

newly named

Arthropoda

New taxa

Fish

Bony fish

Cartilaginous fish

Archosauromorphs

Pseudosuchians

Pterosaurs

Newly named non-dinosaurian dinosauromorphs

Newly named non-avian dinosauromorphs
Data courtesy of George Olshevky's dinosaur genera list.

Newly named birds

Lepidosauromorpha

Plesiosaurs

Synapsids

Non-mammalian

Mammals

Footnotes

Complete author list
As science becomes more collaborative, papers with large numbers of authors are becoming more common. To prevent the deformation of the tables, these footnotes list the contributors to papers that erect new genera and have many authors.

References